The 2017 Thailand Amateur League  is the 1st season of the League competition since its establishment in 2017. It is in the fifth tier of the Thai football league system.

Upper Northern Region

Teams

Qualification round

First Round

Lower Northern Region

Teams

1st Qualification Round

2nd Qualification Round

First Round

Upper North Eastern Region

Teams

Qualification round

First Round

Lower North Eastern Region

Teams

Qualification round

First Round

East zone of Central Region

Teams

Qualification round

First Round

West zone of Central Region

Teams

1st  Qualification Round

2nd Qualification Round

First Round

Upper Eastern Region

Teams

First Round

Lower Eastern Region

Teams

Qualification round

First Round

Bangkok zone of Bangkok Metropolitan Region

Teams

1st Qualification Round

Last Qualification Round

First Round

Metropolitan zone of Bangkok Metropolitan Region

Teams

Qualification round

First Round

Upper Southern Region

Teams

First Round

Lower Southern Region

Teams

First Round

Champions list
Qualified for Final Round

Final round 
Winner of each Region football teams pass to this round. this round plays sudden death matches. The winner will Promoted to the 2018 Thai League 4.

Promoted to Northern Region

Promoted to North Eastern Region

Promoted to North Eastern Region

Promoted to Western Region

Promoted to Bangkok Region

Promoted to Southern Region

See also
 2017 Thai League
 2017 Thai League 2
 2017 Thai League 3
 2017 Thai League 4
 2017 Thai FA Cup
 2017 Thai League Cup
 2017 Thailand Champions Cup

References

 www.thaileague.co.th
 TA Thailand Amateur League

Thailand Amateur League seasons
5